Alok Ranjan is an Indian politician from Bihar and Former Minister of the Art, Culture & Youth department Bihar Government. Alok Ranjan won the Saharsa Assembly constituency on the BJP ticket in the 2020 Bihar Legislative Assembly election.

References 

Living people
Bihar MLAs 2020–2025
Bharatiya Janata Party politicians from Bihar
1974 births